France Bleu Poitou is one of the 44 France Bleu generalist regional stations. France Bleu Poitou serves the departments of Vienne and Deux-Sèvres. It's also accessible to parts of Vendée and the far north of Charente and Charente-Maritime via FM. Charente and Charente-Maritime are served by France Bleu La Rochelle.

Frequencies 
France Bleu Poitou broadcasts in several different places using the FM band:

 Vienne / Deux-Sèvres: 106.4MHz (Amailloux transmitter)
 Poitiers: 87.6 MHz
 Châtellerault: 103.3 MHz
 Niort: 101.0 MHz

References 

Radio stations in France
Radio France
2001 establishments in France
Radio stations established in 2001